The Agronomist is a 2003 American documentary directed by Jonathan Demme about Jean Dominique. The documentary follows the life of Dominique, who ran Haiti's first independent radio station, Radio Haiti-Inter, during multiple repressive regimes.

Summary 
The titular Agronomist is Jean Leopold Dominique, owner of Radio Haiti-Inter, Haiti's first independent radio station. The documentary consists of historical footage and personal interviews director Jonathan Demme conducted years earlier with Dominique.

The film follows Dominique's career as a broadcaster from the founding of Radio Haiti-Inter in 1960 focusing on injustice and promoting democracy for the masses, resulting in clashes with the ruling regimes and Dominique's eventual assassination. Following his death, his wife and fellow journalist, Michèle Montas, broadcast from the station for another three years. Radio Haiti-Inter ceased operations in 2003.

Reception
The Agronomist was shown on May 3, 2004 at the UN Headquarters in NYC while observing World Press Freedom Day.  There were no seats vacant for the showing at noon.

The film received favorable reviews by critics. It received a 96% "fresh" rating on Rotten Tomatoes Praise focused on the use of historical footage combined with interviews.
 
Box office receipts totaled $226,189 in 21 theaters in the U.S.

DVD release
The movie was released on DVD on June 7, 2005 with English and French spoken language tracks, and subtitles in English, Spanish, and French.

See also

 Reporters Without Borders

References

External links 

 Radio Caraibes FM 94.5 live from Port au Prince Haiti, Haitian Radio stations Find all Haitian radio Stations.
 

2003 films
Documentary films about historical events
Documentary films about politicians
Films directed by Jonathan Demme
Films set in Haiti